Borgestad ASA is a Norwegian shipping, industry and real estate company. 
The corporation has two primary divisions: Borgestad Properties and Borgestad Industries.

Borgestad Properties operates 11 open hatch bulk carriers and one Floating Production Storage and Offloading vessel. It also owns a shopping centre in Bytom, Poland and a housing complex at Borgestadholmen in Skien. 
Borgestad Industries  develops and produces refractory and fire-resistant products.

The company dates back to July 1, 1904 when Aktieselskapet Borgestad was founded by Prime Minister Gunnar Knudsen when he merged his shipping companies and listed on the Oslo Stock Exchange ten years later.

References

Shipping companies of Norway
Manufacturing companies of Norway
Real estate companies of Norway
Companies based in Skien
Transport companies established in 1904
1904 establishments in Norway
Companies listed on the Oslo Stock Exchange
Manufacturing companies established in 1904
Real estate companies established in 1904